The Tour Divide is an annual mountain biking ride traversing the length of the Rocky Mountains, from Canada to the Mexican border. Following the  Great Divide Mountain Bike Route, it is an ultra-distance cycling ride that is an extreme test of endurance, self-reliance and mental toughness. The ride format is strictly self-supported, and it is not a stage race - the clock runs continuously from the start until riders cross the finish line, usually more than two weeks later.

The ride has a very low profile, and is entirely amateur. There are no entry fees, no sponsorship, and no prizes. Although "letters of intent" from likely starters are encouraged, any rider may turn up on the day to participate. Challenges along the route include mountains, great distances between resupply towns, risk of mechanical failure or injury, bears, poor weather, snowfall, and significant unrideable sections that require pushing the bike. Riders usually adopt a "bikepacking" style, carrying minimal equipment sufficient for camping or bivouacking, and only enough food and water to last until the next town. In this way, riders ride huge distances each day, the current ride record averaging over 174 miles (280 km) per day.

The Tour Divide has been ridden and completed on both single speed bicycles and tandem bicycles. It usually starts on the second Friday in June - at an event called Grand Départ. The ride can also be completed at any time as an individual time trial (ITT).

Due to the extreme distances, inaccessibility of the route, lack of television coverage and small number of participants, spectating is impractical. However, many riders carry SPOT Satellite Messenger tracking devices, allowing their progress to be continuously monitored on websites.

Records

Ride records are maintained in several categories, and do not distinguish between times set during the official annual ride, or in individual time trials set at any time. Categories include male, female and tandem. As the route changes fairly frequently, the overall length and difficulty can vary, meaning records from one year cannot be exactly compared.

 Male: 13 days, 22 hours, 51 minutes by Mike Hall in 2016 
 Female: 15 days, 10 hours, 59 minutes by Lael Wilcox in August 2015

Winners

Media coverage

The event remains a niche phenomenon, receiving little coverage in mainstream media. A documentary film, Ride the Divide was produced during the 2008 running. It followed several riders, including eventual winner Matthew Lee. The documentary won the "Best Adventure Film" Award at the 2010 Vail Film Festival.

Live reports for the 2018, 2019 and 2021 races which weaves together information from TrackLeaders, the riders' social media, MTBCast and direct contact with the racers to build a comprehensive picture of the race.

Similar ride 
The Trans Am Bike Race (TABR) is similar to the Tour Divide in that riders have to be completely self-supported and a fixed route is used, the main difference is that the TABR is on paved roads. The TABR uses the TransAmerica Bicycle Trail, which runs from the Pacific coast in Oregon, United States, to the Atlantic Coast in Virginia, and like the route of the Tour Divide, was developed by the Adventure Cycling Association.

See also
 Sample gear list and an autobiographical movie on the ride

References

Further reading

Bennet, Christopher: Cordillera Volume 1-7 (paperback)
Homer, Jill: Be Brave, Be Strong

External links

 DotWatcher.cc

Mountain biking events in the United States
Ultra-distance cycling